The Reverend James Newton Gloucester  was an African-American clergyman and businessman who was a supporter of abolitionist John Brown.  Gloucester lived at 265 Bridge Street, Brooklyn, New York.

Like his father, Gloucester was a Black Presbyterian pastor. In 1849 he founded Siloam Presbyterian Church. He and his church members were very active in the Underground Railroad.

Gloucester was also a friend and associate of John Brown. Two letters he wrote to Brown are still extant.

References

African-American abolitionists
African-American Christian clergy
American Christian clergy
African-American businesspeople
American businesspeople
People from Brooklyn
American Presbyterians
19th-century Presbyterians
Underground Railroad people
Year of birth missing
Year of death missing
Activists from New York (state)
Presbyterian abolitionists